Mikosch Comes In may refer to:

 Mikosch Comes In (1928 film), a German silent comedy film
 Mikosch Comes In (1952 film), a West German comedy film